Miss Panamá 2015 this was the 49th "Señorita Panamá" pageant, and the fifth under the new management of Marisela Moreno. Was held at the Megapolis Convention Center on Monday, August 24, 2015. The event was broadcast on Telemetro. 

Miss Panamá 2014, Yomatzy Hazlewood of Darién crowned her successor Gladys Brandao of Los Santos, as the Miss Panama. Nicole Pinto, Miss World Panama 2014 of Panamá Oeste, crowned her successor, Diana Jaen of Cocle, as the Miss World Panama winner and Marisel Franco of Veraguas crowned her successor Catherine Agrazal of Veraguas as the Miss Reinado International del Cafe Panama winner. 

Brandao later competed in Miss Universe 2015, which was held on December 20 at Zappos Theater in Las Vegas, Nevada. Jaén represented Panama in Miss World 2015, which was held on December 19 at the Crown of Beauty Theatre in Sanya, Hainan.

Miss Panamá Universe

The event was held at the Hard Rock Cafe Megapolis Panamá in Panama City, Panama, on August 24, 2015. A total of 24 contestants from around the country competed for the title. At the end of the event, Miss Panamá 2014, Yomatzy Hazlewood, crowned her successor as the new Miss Panamá.

Final results

Special awards

Costume competition
This year, a preliminary costume competition was held, where Panamanian designers competed to design costumes that combined the past and present of Panama. The winning costume went on to represent Panamá in Miss Universe 2015.

Preliminary interviews
Preliminary interviews were held on August 23. Miss Panamá candidates wore swimsuits and had personal interviews.

Judges
 Virginia Hernández - Miss World Panamá 2013
 Maricely González - Miss World Panamá 2012
 Irene Núñez - Miss World Panamá 2011
 Yesenia Casanova - Miss World Panamá 1999
 Madeleine Legnadier - Miss World Panamá 1990
 Ricardo Quintero - Fashion photographer
 Orly Benzacar
 José Luis Rodríguez
 Maria Fernanda Maduro
 Michael Horth

Miss Panamá World

The Miss Panamá Mundo pageant was held at the Hotel Hard Rock Cafe Megapolis, Panama City, Panama, on August 24. Around 24 contestants from all over Panamá competed for the title. This year, by decision of the international Miss World Organization, the election of the new global sovereign was held in a separate competition to the traditional national election. Nicole Pinto (Miss Panamá World 2014) crowned her successor, Diana Jaén, as the new Miss Panamá World.

Final results

Official contestants
The following table lists the competitors who have been selected.

Presentation show
This preliminary competition (also called "The Runway" and the "Council of the Misses") was held on August 3. The 24 finalists were selected for the pageant. A jury panel, together with the advice of the misses, selected the finalists based on individual performances during events in the Swimsuit and Cocktail Dress categories.

Preliminary contestants
The following contestants were part of the top 30, but were eliminated in the preliminary meeting on August 5.

Historical significance
Different regions and provinces were used this year, changing the naming format used previously.
Los Santos won Miss Panamá for eighth time in history. The previous time was in 2009, when Diana Broce won.
Veraguas won Reinado Internacional del Cafe Panamá for the second consecutive year.
Panama Centro failed to advance to the final round for the second consecutive year.
Darien reached the top six for the second consecutive year.
Bocas del Toro reached the final top after three years. The previous time was in 2012, with Maricely González.
Colón reached the final top after two years. The previous time was in 2013, with Zumay Elena Antonios.
States reached the top six the previous year were Veraguas, Los Santos, Darien, and Herrera.

Election schedule
August 5: presentation show
August 5: costume competition
August 24: final night and coronation of Miss Panamá 2015

Candidates notes
 Nayomy Mendoza participated in the National Pageants: Miss Panama Latinoamericana 2014 and won the tittle Miss Global Panamá 2014.
 Estefanía Mora Quirós participated in the national pageant: Bellezas Panamá 2013.
 Genesis Arjona was Miss Globe Panamá 2014 and participated in the Miss Globe International 2014 in Azerbaijan, where she reached the top 20.
 Diana Jaén was Miss Tourism International Panamá 2013 and participated in the Miss Tourism International 2013 in Malaysia.
 Gladys Brandao was Miss Yacht Model Panamá 2012 and participated in Miss Yacht Model International 2012 in Sanya, Hainan.
 Daniela Ochoa competed in Miss International 2016 pageant, which was held on October 27, 2016, at the Tokyo Dome City Hall in Tokyo, Japan.

References

External links
Panamá 2015 official website
Miss Panamá
Facebook

Señorita Panamá
Panama
2015 in Panama